Jinqiao Subdistrict, formerly Meliuqiao Hui Ethnic Township, is a subdistrict located in the southern side of Dongli District, Tianjin, China. It borders Huaming Subdistrict in the north, Junliangcheng Subdistrict in the east, Shuangqiaohe and Xianshuigu Towns in the south, Xinzhuang Town in the southeast, as well as Tianjin Aviation Logistics District and Xinli Subdistrict in the west. In 2010, the subdistrict has 14,252 people residing under its administration.

The name Jinqiao literally means "Golden Bridge".

History

Administrative divisions 
As of the year 2022, Jinqiao Subdistrict was comprised of 8 residential communities and 3 villages. They are listed below:

See also 

 List of township-level divisions of Tianjin

References 

Township-level divisions of Tianjin
Dongli District